The Sumatran crow (Euploea martinii) is a species of nymphalid butterfly in the Danainae subfamily. It is endemic to Sumatra, Indonesia.

References

Euploea
Butterflies of Indonesia
Endemic fauna of Indonesia
Fauna of Sumatra
Taxonomy articles created by Polbot
Butterflies described in 1893